Hora Svatého Václava is a municipality and village in Domažlice District in the Plzeň Region of the Czech Republic. It has about 70 inhabitants.

Administrative parts
Villages of Načetín and Šidlákov are administrative parts of Hora Svatého Václava.

References

Villages in Domažlice District